Ashiyan or Ashian , also rendered as Ishian, may refer to:
 Ashiyan, Gilan
 Ashiyan, Isfahan
 Ashiyan Rural District, in Isfahan Province